Nathalie Goulet (born 24 May 1958) is a member of the Senate of France, representing the Orne department. She is a member of the Union of Democrats and Independents and sits with the political group of the Centrist Union. 

She is a member of the commission of Foreign Affairs and Defense Forces. 

In the Senate, she supports nuclear negotiations with Iran, as well as the cause of Palestinian and Azerbaijani refugees. 

Goulet advocated for the recognition of the Armenian genocide, whilst at the same time promoting relationships with Turkey and Arab countries. She also criticizes the repression of opponents in Iran.

Notes

References
Page on the Senate website

1958 births
Living people
French Senators of the Fifth Republic
People from Boulogne-Billancourt
Politicians from Normandy
Women members of the Senate (France)
Union of Democrats and Independents politicians
21st-century French women politicians
Senators of Orne